Tang Jiaxuan (born January 17, 1938) is a Chinese diplomat and politician who was foreign minister of the People's Republic of China from 1998–2003.

After various diplomatic postings in Japan, he became Assistant to the Minister of Foreign Affairs in 1991, Vice Minister of Foreign Affairs in 1993 and Minister of Foreign Affairs from 1998 to 2003. He continued to serve on the State Council until 2008.

Publications
In 2009, Tang published Jing Yu Xu Feng, a memoir covering ten years of Tang's experiences in China's Foreign Ministry from 1998 to 2008. It was translated into English and published by Harper in 2011 as Heavy Storm & Gentle Breeze: A Memoir of China's Diplomacy.

External links
Tang Jiaxuan biography @ China Vitae, the web's largest online database of China VIPs
 http://www.china.org.cn/english/features/58555.htm

Foreign Ministers of the People's Republic of China
Chinese diplomats
1938 births
Living people
Chinese Communist Party politicians from Jiangsu
Politicians from Zhenjiang
People's Republic of China politicians from Jiangsu
Fudan University alumni
20th-century Chinese politicians
21st-century Chinese politicians
State councillors of China